Ute is a British-Australian band formed by Ian Dixon on trumpet and keyboards and Wayne Elliott on bass guitar and keyboards. Their music has been described as acid jazz. Their album Under The External was nominated for ARIA Award for Best New Talent at the ARIA Music Awards of 1996

History 
British-born Ian Dixon and Wayne Elliott met in 1987 when both were students at Adelaide's Elder Conservatorium of Music, while studying music. They formed a dance, jazz group, Switzerland and completed their studies.

Dixon and Elliott relocated to Melbourne, where they formed Ute. The group recorded demos and found greater interest in the English market, hence they relocated to London in the 1990s. They issued their debut album, Free to Be... Free to Breathe, in 1992 via 33 Records, with the pair co-producing.

Discography

Studio album

Singles 
"It's a Soul Thing" (1993) - 33 Records
"One Time" (1993) - 33 Records
"Joint Just Jumping" (1996) - id/Mercury
"Not Like You" (1996) - id/Mercury
"The Third Way"

Awards and nominations

ARIA Music Awards
The ARIA Music Awards is an annual awards ceremony that recognises excellence, innovation, and achievement across all genres of Australian music. They commenced in 1987.

! 
|-
| ARIA Music Awards of 1996
| Under The External
| ARIA Award for Best New Talent
| 
| 
|-

References

Australian jazz ensembles